María Vázquez (born 19 March 1979 in Vigo, Galicia) is a Spanish actress.  Vázquez has appeared in such films as Mataharis, Mar libre, María (and Everybody Else) and The Year of the Tick.  Her numerous television credits include Hospital Real, Padre Casares and La fuga.

References

External links

1979 births
Living people
People from Vigo
Spanish film actresses
Spanish television actresses
Actresses from Galicia (Spain)
21st-century Spanish actresses